Kevin Tano (born 17 April 1993 in Amsterdam) is a Dutch footballer who plays for Akritas Chlorakas. He formerly played for FC Volendam, ADO Den Haag and FC Dordrecht.

Career

Akritas Chlorakas
Leaving PS Kemi at the end of 2018, Tano joined Cypriot club Akritas Chlorakas in September 2019.

References

External links

1993 births
Living people
Dutch footballers
Dutch people of Ghanaian descent
Footballers from Amsterdam
Eredivisie players
Challenger Pro League players
2. Liga (Austria) players
Eerste Divisie players
Liga Leumit players
Veikkausliiga players
FC Volendam players
ADO Den Haag players
FC Dordrecht players
Royal Antwerp F.C. players
Maccabi Herzliya F.C. players
SV Horn players
Kemi City F.C. players
Akritas Chlorakas players
Dutch expatriate footballers
Expatriate footballers in Austria
Dutch expatriate sportspeople in Austria
Expatriate footballers in Belgium
Dutch expatriate sportspeople in Belgium
Expatriate footballers in Israel
Dutch expatriate sportspeople in Israel
Expatriate footballers in Cyprus
Dutch expatriate sportspeople in Cyprus
Expatriate footballers in Finland
Dutch expatriate sportspeople in Finland
Association football forwards